Adrian Anthony Lester  (born Anthony Harvey; 14 August 1968) is a British actor, director and writer. He is the recipient of a Laurence Olivier Award, an Evening Standard Theatre Award and a Critics' Circle Theatre Award for his work on the London stage.

Early life
Lester was born in Birmingham, the son of Jamaican immigrants, Monica, a medical secretary, and Reginald, a manager for a contract cleaning company. From the age of nine, Lester sang as a boy treble in the choir of St Chad's Cathedral, Birmingham. At 14, he began acting with the Birmingham Youth Theatre. After leaving Archbishop Masterson RC School, he attended Joseph Chamberlain Sixth Form College for one year, before completing three years of training at the Royal Academy of Dramatic Art in London.

Career

Theatre
Lester received an Ian Charleson Award commendation and a Time Out Award for his 1991 performance as Rosalind in Cheek by Jowl's all-male production of As You Like It. In 1993, he played Anthony Hope in the National Theatre's production of Sweeney Todd: The Demon Barber of Fleet Street. He has also appeared on stage as Robert in the musical Company, for which he won an Olivier Award, and in the title role of Hamlet (Carlton TV Theatre Award).

In 2003, Lester played the title role in Henry V at the National Theatre.

In 2010, he played the part of Brick in Tennessee Williams' play Cat on a Hot Tin Roof at the Novello Theatre in London.

In 2012, Lester appeared as Ira Aldridge in the play Red Velvet, written by his wife Lolita Chakrabarti.

Lester played the part of Othello in the Shakespeare play of the same name in 2013 alongside Rory Kinnear as Iago at the National Theatre. Both actors won the Best Actor award in the Evening Standard Theatre Awards for their roles; the award is traditionally given to only one actor, but the judges were unable to choose between the pair.

In 2021, Lester appeared in the live-streamed production of Hymn written by his wife Lolita Chakrabarti for the Almeida Theatre. The play co-starred Danny Sapani and was performed with social distancing in place in accordance with COVID-19 restrictions. 

Lester made his Broadway debut in the 2021 production of The Lehman Trilogy, directed by Sam Mendes.

Television
In 1997, Lester starred in an episode of Silent Witness. It was in a two-part episode of series two entitled "Cease upon the Midnight", where he played the part of Danny Morris.

Lester is known for playing a big-time con artist named Michael "Mickey Bricks" Stone on the BBC television series Hustle between 2004 and 2012. The character was written out of the fourth series and replaced by Ashley Walters, although Lester returned from the fifth series (2009) onwards.

On American television, Lester appeared on the sitcom Girlfriends from 2002 to 2003, as Ellis Carter, a film star who dated Tracee Ellis Ross's character, Joan Clayton.

In late 2005, Lester had a major guest-starring role in Channel 4's police drama The Ghost Squad.

In 2008, Lester starred on the BBC drama Bonekickers, a programme focusing on a team of archaeologists.

He also played the character Myror on the British television drama Merlin.

Film
Lester played campaign manager Henry Burton in Mike Nichols' film Primary Colors (1998), based on the novel by Anonymous (Joe Klein). His character is believed to represent George Stephanopoulos. This part earned him a Chicago Film Critics Association award nomination for "Most Promising Actor".

Lester appeared in Kenneth Branagh's Love's Labour's Lost, a musical adaptation of the William Shakespeare play, set in the 1930s. The film itself was poorly received, but Lester received a British Independent Film Awards nomination for his performance.

In The Day After Tomorrow, Lester had a minor role as Simon, one of the three researchers who drink a toast of "twelve-year-old Scotch" shortly before freezing to death.

Lester filmed scenes for Spider-Man 3 (2007), as a research scientist who is sought after by the Sandman (Thomas Haden Church) to find a cure for his ailing daughter. He was seen in one teaser trailer for the film; however, his scenes were cut from the final theatrical version.

Other work
In 2010, Lester appeared in the documentary When Romeo Met Juliet together with his wife Lolita Chakrabarti as acting mentors to the pupils of two Coventry schools involved in a production of Romeo and Juliet.

Lester recorded Alpha Force: Survival, an audio book written by Chris Ryan.

Personal life
In 1997 Lester married actress and writer Lolita Chakrabarti, whom he met while they were both students at RADA. They live in south east London with their two daughters, Lila and Jasmine.

In 2007, Lester took part in Empire's Children, a Channel 4 documentary exploring the journey taken by the "Windrush Generation" to the United Kingdom. Lester's grandfather, Kenneth Nathaniel Lester, was to be included in the documentary, but was unwell during filming in Jamaica and could not be interviewed. Kenneth died soon after the documentary completed filming and never saw the programme aired.

In April 2013, Lester appeared on the Cultural Exchange feature of Front Row on Radio Four, a feature of the programme where people had to choose a piece of art that meant a great deal to them. He chose "Redemption Song" by Bob Marley.

Lester holds a second degree black belt in Moo Duk Kwan Taekwondo.

Filmography

Film

Television

Awards and honours 
Lester was appointed Officer of the Order of the British Empire (OBE) in the 2013 New Year Honours and Commander of the Order of the British Empire (CBE) in the 2020 Birthday Honours, both for services to drama.

In July 2013, he received an honorary degree from the University of Warwick.

In July 2019, Lester was made an Honorary Doctor of Arts at De Montfort University, Leicester.

References

External links
 Adrian Lester at the British Film Institute
 

1968 births
English people of Jamaican descent
Alumni of RADA
Black British male actors
Commanders of the Order of the British Empire
Critics' Circle Theatre Award winners
English male film actors
English male musical theatre actors
English male television actors
English male voice actors
Laurence Olivier Award winners
People from Birmingham, West Midlands
English male Shakespearean actors
English male stage actors
Living people
English male taekwondo practitioners